Bonnie Tyler is a Welsh singer who has released seventeenth studio albums. Her career has led to three Goldene Europa awards, an Echo Award, a Variety Club of Great Britain Award, a Gold Badge Award for her contribution to Britain's Music Industry, and a Steiger Award for a lifetime career in music.
Tyler represented the United Kingdom at the World Popular Song Festival in 1979, winning the festival with her song "Sitting on the Edge of the Ocean". She later represented the United Kingdom at the Eurovision Song Contest in 2013.

Awards and nominations

Other accolades

Honours

Listicles 
Billboard

|-
!scope="row" rowspan="11"| 1978
| Herself
| Pop Female Artist 
|
|-
| Herself
| Pop New Artist Combined (Male/Female)
|
|-
| Herself
| Pop Single Artist Combined (Male/Female)
|
|-
| Herself
| Pop Female Single Artist 
|
|-
| Herself
| New Female Single Artist 
|
|-
| Herself
| New Female Album Artist 
|
|-
| Herself
| New Country Single Artist 
|
|-
| It's a Heartache
| Pop Singles
|
|-
| It's a Heartache
| Pop Singles Artists
|
|-
| It's a Heartache
| Country Albums
|
|-
| Herself
| Country Albums Artists
|
|-
!scope="row" | 1979
|rowspan= 8| Bonnie Tyler
| Top Female Album Artist (World of Country Music) 
| 
|-
!scope="row" rowspan=4|1983 
| Top Pop Single Artist Combined
| 
|-
| Top Pop Single 
| 
|-
| Pop Album Artist Female
| 
|-
| Top Pop Single Artist Female
| 
|-
!scope="row" rowspan=3|1984
| Top Female Album Artist 
| 
|-
| Top Pop Female Single Artist 
| 
|-
|Top Pop Single Artist
| 
|-
|}

Cashbox

|-
| rowspan="19"| 1978
| Herself
| Pop Female Vocalists Singles 
|
|-
| Herself
| New Pop Female Vocalists Singles 
|
|-
| Herself
| New Female Vocalists Longest Charted
|
|-
| Herself
| Female Vocalists Highest Debuts
|
|-
| Herself
| New Female Vocalists Highest Debuts
|
|-
| Herself
| A/C Female Vocalists (Pop Single)
|
|-
| Herself
| Country Female Crossover
|
|-
| Herself
| Female Vocalists (Pop Album)
|
|-
| Herself
| New Female Vocalists (Pop Album)
|
|-
| Herself
| New Female Vocalists Highest Debuts (Pop Album)
|
|-
| Herself
| New Female Vocalists Longest Charted
|
|-
| It's a Heartache
| Top 100 Singles
|
|-
| Herself
| New Female Vocalist (Country Poll)
|
|-
| Herself
| New Female Vocalist Highest Debuts 
|
|-
| Herself
| New Female Vocalist Longest Charted
|
|-
| Herself
| Female Vocalists (Country)
|
|-
| Herself
| New Female Vocalists (Country)
|
|-
| Herself
| New Female Vocalist Highest Debut (Country)
|
|-
| Herself
| Top FM Rotation 1978 (Country)
|
|-
| rowspan="6"| 1983
|Herself
|Female (Pop Single)
|
|-
|Herself
|A/C Female 
|
|-
|Herself
| Female (Pop Album)
|
|-
|Herself
|Pop Album Female A/C 
|
|-
|Total Eclipse of the Heart
|Top 100 Singles
|
|-
|Faster Than The Speed of Night
|Top 100 Albums
|
|-

Record World

|-
| rowspan="2"|1978
| Bonnie Tyler
| Solista Femenino Extranjera del Año (Spotlight on Spain)
|
|-
| Bonnie Tyler
| Most Promising Female Vocalist (Mid Year Award)
|
|-
| rowspan="3"| 1979 || It's a Heartache || Top Record Solo Artist ||  
|-
|rowspan=| Bonnie Tyler || Top Female Vocalist ||  
|-
|rowspan=| Bonnie Tyler || Most Promising Female Vocalist || 
|-
|}

Notes

References

Tyler, Bonnie
Awards